Sorbiniperca scheuchzeri is an extinct species of zeiid fish from the Eocene of Monte Bolca. It, and its close relative Sorbinicapros, comprise the extinct zeiform family Sorbinipercidae.

References
 Fishes of the World by Joseph S. Nelson (page 340)
 Exceptional Fossil Preservation by David J. Bottjer, Walter Etter, James W. Hagadorn, and Carol M. Tang (page 377)

Eocene fish
Zeiformes
Fossils of Italy
Prehistoric ray-finned fish genera